The following are scheduled destinations of Wind Jet, an airline based in Italy:

Africa
Egypt
 Sharm el-Sheikh International Airport – seasonal

Asia
Israel
 Ben Gurion International Airport – seasonal charter

Europe
Czech Republic
 Prague – Ruzyně Airport
France
 Paris – Charles de Gaulle Airport
Germany
Berlin – Tegel Airport
Italy
 Bergamo – Orio al Serio Airport
 Bologna – Guglielmo Marconi Airport
 Catania-Fontanarossa Airport – hub
 Milan
Linate Airport
Malpensa Airport
 Palermo – Palermo Airport – base
 Parma – Parma Airport
 Pisa – Galileo Galilei Airport
 Rimini – Federico Fellini Airport – base
 Rome – Leonardo da Vinci Airport
 Turin Caselle Airport
 Venice Marco Polo Airport
 Verona Airport
Netherlands
 Amsterdam – Airport Schiphol
Romania
 Bucharest – Henri Coanda International Airport
 Timișoara – Timișoara Traian Vuia International Airport
Russia
 Moscow – Domodedovo International Airport
 St Petersburg – Pulkovo Airport
Spain
 Barcelona – El Prat Airport
Ukraine
 Kyiv – Boryspil International Airport

References

Wind Jet